Northern Region Farm Machinery Training and Testing Institute, Hisar is a public funded agricultural and farm training and testing institute located at Sirsa road, Hisar in the Indian state of Haryana. It is one of the four such institutes established by the Government of India's Ministry of Agriculture & Farmers Welfare. It had imparted training to students hailing from all over India and 27+ other nations and annual Krishi Darshan Expo is held at institute in October.

History
In 1955, for the adoption of mechanized cultivation a Government of India initially set up the Central Agricultural Machinery Utilization Training Centre at Budhni in Madhya Pradesh. Three more
regional Farm Machinery Training and Testing Institutes were set up at Hisar (1963) for the northern region, Garladinne in Anantapur district of Andhra Pradesh (1983) for the southern region and Biswanath Chariali in Assam (1990) for the eastern region. It is most important farm machinery training centre in the state of Haryana. It has 153.20 hectares campus. It offers testing, training and workshop in farm machinery. Facilities include farm, ~200 equipment, classrooms, library, rest house (eight bed), dispensary and hostel (150 students). It trains nearly 2,000 farmer, managers, academics and students every year.

See also 
 List of institutions of higher education in Haryana
 List of universities and colleges in Hisar
 List of agricultural universities and colleges
 List of think tanks in India

References

External links 
 Official website

Research institutes in Hisar (city)
Agricultural universities and colleges in Haryana
Universities and colleges in Haryana
Universities and colleges in Hisar (city)
Agriculture in Haryana
1963 establishments in East Punjab
Research institutes established in 1963
Educational institutions established in 1963